Popeye Saves The Earth is a 1994 widebody pinball game designed by Python Anghelo and Barry Oursler and released by WMS Industries under the Bally label. It is based on the Popeye comic/cartoon characters licensed from King Features Syndicate.

It is part of WMS' SuperPin line of widebody games.

References

External links
 

Pinball machines based on comics
1994 pinball machines
Bally pinball machines
Popeye